Bal Krishen Rathore is a UAE based businessman, investor and entrepreneur of Indian origin and the Chairman and CEO of Century Financial. He was listed in the top 100 inspiring leaders in the UAE by Arabian Business. He has been granted the Golden Visa by the government of UAE in 2021.

Early life
Rathore grew up in a small district in the Indian state of Jammu & Kashmir as one of the nine siblings in a family with limited means. He started his career by working in the hospitality industry in Dubai. Rathore met Sulaiman Baqer Mohebi, an Emirati entrepreneur, the then Chairman of Century Financial and started as a dealer for the company in 1999.

Rathore started as a dealer in Century Financial in 1999. Rathore looked after transactions across exchanges. Later he became the Chairman and CEO of the company.

Awards & recognitions

Initiatives

Rathore and his company Century Financial entered into an agreement with the government of India to invest 100 million dollars in Jammu & Kashmir.

Rathore is also actively devoted to philanthropic causes highlighted by his support for various NGOs promoting human welfare in the UAE and India, specifically his contributions to supporting his home state Jammu & Kashmir. He has taken it upon himself to lead the way in terms of contributing to the business and investments support for Jammu & Kashmir. He is a highly respected business leader in the UAE and has won many prestigious awards as a part of his leadership and pioneering efforts in contributing to the business and industry in the UAE.

References

Indian businesspeople
Indian emigrants to the United Arab Emirates
Indian expatriates in the United Arab Emirates
Year of birth missing (living people)
Living people
People from Jammu and Kashmir